Louis Mékarski (in Polish Ludwik Mękarski) (1843, Clermont-Ferrand, France – 1923) was a French engineer and inventor of Polish origin. In the 1870s he invented the so-called Mekarski system of compressed-air powered trams which was used in several cities of France and USA as alternative to horse-powered and steam-powered trams.

Patents
Louis Mékarski (with Paul Lucas-Girardville, an early aviator) patented a similar system for automobiles in 1903. Waste heat from an internal combustion engine generated steam, which was mixed with compressed air from an air compressor driven by the ic engine. The air/steam mixture then drove a separate piston engine which propelled the vehicle. This system pre-dated the better-known Still engine.

Mékarski also obtained a patent for spring wheels for vehicles.

Commemoration
In Nantes there is a street Rue Louis Mékarski.

References 

19th-century French engineers
19th-century French inventors
French people of Polish descent
1843 births
1923 deaths